Sir David Hamilton of Cadzow, 3rd Laird of Cadzow (ca. 1333 – ca. 1392) was a Scottish nobleman. The son of David fitz Walter fitz Gilbert of Cadzow, he was born at Cadzow Castle, South Lanarkshire.

David Hamilton was the first of the family recorded as formally using the surname Hamilton, appearing in a writ of 1375 as "David de Hamylton, son and heir of David fitz Walter". in 1378, he is styled David de Hamilton, and in 1381 David Hamilton, Lord of Cadzow. It appears that he was the first to use the Baronial designation of Lord.

Marriage and issue
David Hamilton married Jonetta Keith daughter of Sir William Keith of Galston, a crusading colleague of the Good Sir James Douglas. She survived David Hamilton, and went on to marry Sir Alexander Stewart of Darnley. By Jonetta Keith, David Hamilton had six children:
John Hamilton of Cadzow
Sir William Hamilton – ancestor of the Hamiltons of Bathgate
Andrew Hamilton – ancestor of the Hamiltons of Udstoun
John Hamilton of Bardowie
Elizabeth Hamilton – married Sir Alexander Fraser of Cowie
George Hamilton of Borland

References

Notes

Sources
Anderson, John, Historical and genealogical memoirs of the House of Hamilton; with genealogical memoirs of the several branches of the family Edinburgh 1825 
Balfour Paul, Sir James, The Scots Peerage Vol IV. Edinburgh 1907 
The Peerage.com

1330s births
1390s deaths
Scoto-Normans
People from South Lanarkshire
David
Year of birth uncertain

Year of death uncertain